The Inniswood Metro Gardens (123 acres), is a botanical garden and nature preserve located at 940 South Hempstead Road in Westerville, Ohio. It is open daily from 7 am until dark without an admission fee. It is part of the Metro Parks system of Columbus, Ohio.

The garden site was first established as the  estate of sisters Grace and Mary Innis. They gave their home and land to Metro Parks in 1972.

The garden now contains more than 2,000 plant species, including collections of conifers, daffodils, daylilies, hostas, and theme gardens (Biblical, herbal, medicinal, rose, and woodland rock garden). Plantings include peony, bearded iris, daylilies, and naturalized daffodils. Woodland trails are lined with wildflowers.

See also
 List of botanical gardens in the United States

References

External links

 

Botanical gardens in Ohio
Protected areas of Franklin County, Ohio
Westerville, Ohio